Greensborough is a suburb of Melbourne, Victoria, Australia,  north-east from Melbourne's Central Business District, located within the City of Banyule and Shire of Nillumbik local government areas. Greensborough recorded a population of 21,070 at the 2021 census.

Etymology
The suburb was named after settler Edward Bernard Green, who was also the district mail contractor. Formerly it was known as Keelbundoora.

History

In 1838, Henry Smythe, a Crown grantee, purchased 259 hectares for 544 pounds, from John Alison. The boundaries of this land included Gold Street in the North, Macorna Street in the West, Grimshaw Street in the South and Plenty River in the East. In 1841 he sold this land for 1600 pounds to Edward Bernard Green and it was from Green that Greensborough derived its name.

The township was established in the late 1850s, with the Post Office opening on 17 July 1858. In 1842, Charteris Lieutenant, Robert Whatmough started his own orchard. Whatmough's knowledge of botany was extensive and had published a comprehensive book on Botany after arriving in Australia. Trees can still be found growing in Greensborough, along the Plenty River Trail. By 1871, Greensborough had a population of 167 and by 1933 had grown to 940.

In 1845 a small private school was established. The school was a slab hut with a large fireplace that filled the end wall. Mr. Purcell, the teacher charged two shillings, per week for each of his twenty pupils. The building was destroyed by fire and another school did not re-open until 1854. There is very little information about the school or the teaching methods of Mr. Purcell.

A telegraph line connecting Greensborough and Diamond Creek with Heidelberg was completed in 1888. From 27 July 1888 a telephone link across the line was added so that telegrams could be sent or received by telephone.

During the 1880s and 1890s Diamond Valley became popular with excursionists from inner Melbourne. Tourism increased with the advent of the railway line in the twentieth century. Greensborough was noted for its fishing (cod, perch, blackfish and eels). Another leisure pursuit that was taken up by visitors was shooting. Rabbit and hares were plentiful and the hotel provided accommodation for weekend visitors.

The Diamond Valley Football Association was formed 1922 at Diamond Creek and initially consisted of teams from Kangaroo Ground, Eltham, Diamond Creek, Templestowe, Greensborough, and Warrandyte.

Greensborough Hotel 
In 1864, the Greensborough Hotel, formally known as the Farmers Arms Hotel, was built by Englishman James Iredale. It served as a stopping point for travellers on their way to the goldfields further north. By law, a lit lantern was required as a sign of welcome to those needing a well-earned rest or to refresh their horses. The hotel was demolished and rebuilt in 1925 by then-owner Denis Monahan. Greensborough Hotel, by architects Sydney Smith, Ogg and Serpell, 349 Collins Street, Melbourne, has been well thought out, and the three sources of income - the bar, the dining room and the residential section, although all under easy supervision from the office, are kept absolutely distinct, so that visitors to any of these three sections are separate. Greensborough Hotel is the second hotel to occupy this site and represents a continuation of use spanning close to 150 years. It is aesthetically significant as an unusual example of the inter-War Spanish Mission style hotel in the suburb of Greensborough. It is one of the few early twentieth-century buildings remaining in the area and has become a landmark in the commercial centre of Greensborough. The hotel is located on the corner of Main Street and The Circuit, Greensborough. The latest owner of the hotel is George Hamad.

There are 13 plaques installed from the corner of Grimshaw and Henry Street, down Grimshaw and left into Main Street featuring historical information.

Geography

Greensborough borders the beginning of the Green Wedge, an area of bush land that runs northward into Eltham and Diamond Creek. The Plenty River, a tributary of the Yarra River, runs through Greensborough, joining the Yarra at Templestowe.

Government
In 2017, Banyule City Council moved their main offices to Greensborough from Ivanhoe as part of the wider "One Flintoff" project which included new offices and community facilities that were built above WaterMarc. The civic centre includes three level offices to accommodate 320 Council staff, community and function rooms. The centre was designed by Peddle Thorp.

The Shire of Nillumbik also operates it offices located in Greensborough at the site of the former Diamond Valley offices, next to the Diamond Valley library.

Amenities

Greensborough's main retail area is Main Street. Greensborough Plaza is a major regional shopping centre which services Melbourne's north-eastern suburbs. It was built in 1976 and has since undergone numerous renovations from a small shopping centre into a multi-storey facility. The shopping centre's major tenants include Coles, ALDI, Kmart, Target, Chemist Warehouse, JB Hi-Fi Home, The Reject Shop, Rebel Sport, Anytime Fitness and Hoyts Cinemas.

In 2009, the Greensborough Town Centre was set to receive a major upgrade although most of the improvements were delayed or cancelled due to the global financial crisis. Following this time, several new facilities were built, including a new aquatic centre, WaterMarc, a multi-level car park and Greensborough Walk, a new pedestrian promenade connecting Main Street with Watermarc. 

Diamond Valley Library, Civic Drive, Greensborough is operated by Yarra Plenty Regional Library.

The Greensborough Historical Society is located in the suburb and aims to collect, catalogue, preserve and share the history and heritage of Greensborough.

Transport

Road
Greensborough and the surrounding suburbs is serviced by a network of roads including the Greensborough Highway, which bypasses the town centre and connects to the Metropolitan Ring Road. The main street is Main Street which runs into Diamond Creek Road, while other main arterials include Para Road which runs south and Grimshaw Street which runs west.

Rail

Greensborough railway station services the central area of Greensborough. It is a staffed station on the Hurstbridge railway line with an island platform.

Bus
The suburb serves as a major hub for bus services for the surrounding area, with most services departing from the Main Street terminal. To this end, pedestrian links between the station and Main Street were due to be upgraded in between 2010 and 2015 as part of the Greensborough Project development to improve public transport connectivity. These links have not yet been re-proposed by either local, state or federal governments.

Education

The first government primary school opened in 1875. Greensborough College is a high school with approximately 518 students, located between Greensborough and Watsonia. Greensborough is also home to several primary schools including Greensborough Primary School, located next to Greensborough Plaza and established in 1878, St Mary's Catholic Primary School, St Thomas the Apostle Catholic Primary School, Greenhills Primary School, Watsonia Heights Primary School and Apollo Parkways Primary School.

The Greensborough Melbourne Polytechnic campus reopened in 2017 aided by a $10 million state government investment after initially closing in 2013.

Sport and recreation

Greensborough has an AFL team playing in the Northern Football League. Diamond Valley United Soccer Club also play at Partington's Flat and currently compete in Victorian State League Division 2.

Greensborough has a polyurethane athletic track at Willinda Park, which is the home of the Diamond Valley Little Athletics Centre, the largest Little Athletics Centre in Victoria with over 750 athletes, the Diamond Valley Athletic Club and the Ivanhoe Harriers.

The DVE Aquatic Club also operates out of Watermarc.

Greensborough is also home to multiple tennis clubs including; St Mary’s tennis club, which has two court locations and Greensborough tennis club. Both of which are located along the Plenty River. The Grace Valley Tennis Club was established in 1979 with en tout cas courts built in Central Park.

The Greensborough Bypass Trail is a shared use path for cyclists and pedestrians. It starts at Grimshaw Street.

Parks, gardens and reserves
Andrew Yandell Reserve, Greensborough is located at 37 St. Helena Road, Greensborough, Victoria. The site occupies over six hectares of indigenous bushland maintained by the City of Banyule. The Yandell Habitat Reserve is of local historic, scientific, social, and aesthetic significance to the City of Banyule.

Willinda Park is located at the end of Nell Street, near the Plenty River Trail.

Notable residents 

 Johnny Chester, Singer songwriter
 Tracey Grimshaw, Journalist and television presenter
 Michael Hill, cricketer
 Karen Martini, Chef, restaurateur, writer and television presenter
 Denise Scott, comedian, actor, television and radio presenter

See also
 Shire of Diamond Valley – Greensborough was previously within this former local government area.
 City of Banyule – Greensborough is currently within this local government area.

References

External links
 Greensborough Town Centre

Suburbs of Melbourne
Suburbs of the City of Banyule
Suburbs of the Shire of Nillumbik